Rodrigo Plá (born 9 June 1968 in Montevideo, Uruguay) is a Uruguayan screenwriter and director. He is best known for his 2007 film La Zona (The Zone).

Plá studied photography, screenwriting and direction at the Centro de capacitación cinematográfica in Mexico City, where he has lived since he was 9 years old. In 1988 he directed his first short-film.

His 2012 film The Delay was selected as the Uruguayan entry for the Best Foreign Language Oscar at the 85th Academy Awards, but it did not make the final shortlist.

Rodrigo is married to writer Laura Santullo, who has written all the screenplays for all four of his full-length feature films, including his latest, Un Monstruo de Mil Cabezas ("A Monster With a Thousand Heads"), which was based on her novel by the same name.

Filmography 
Novia Mía, 1996
El ojo en la nuca, 2001
La Zona, 2007
Desierto adentro, 2008
Revolución, 2010
The Delay, 2012
Un Monstruo de Mil Cabezas, 2015

References

External links
On Rodrigo Plá at La Jornada

1968 births
Ariel Award winners
Best Director Ariel Award winners
Living people
Uruguayan film directors
Spanish-language film directors
People from Montevideo
Uruguayan people of Catalan descent
Uruguayan emigrants to Mexico